Kiyangkongrejo (Kyangkong Rejo), more commonly referred to as Kiyangkong, is a village in the district of Kutoarjo, Purworejo, Central Java, Indonesia. Located less than 5 kilometers from the city of Kutoarjo.

Based on its geographical location, Kiyangkongrejo divided into three hamlets:
 Kiyangkongrejo Lor (northern)
 Kiyangkongrejo Kidul (southern)
 Kiyangkongrejo Wetan (eastern)

Kiyangkongrejo Wetan (eastern) was divided into two sub-hamlet:
 Kiyangkongrejo Wetan southern part is called "Njebor"
 Kiyangkongrejo Wetan northern part is called "Kedung Sumur"

Separation of the hamlet is based on the road that divides the village into three parts. Separation of the village in order to call the area becomes easier, to control all the affairs of government administrations are at the Kepala Desa (Village Head).

Villages in Central Java